"Goodbye Is Forever" is the second single released by the Duran Duran offshoot band, Arcadia. The song achieved success only in the United States, peaking at number 33 on the Billboard Hot 100 chart in March, 1986. It also was released by Capitol Records in January 1986 in many regions around the world except the UK.

The B-side of Goodbye Is Forever was the mid-tempo ballad "Missing" which was released only as a promo track in the U.S and Canada.

Music video
A video was made for both the A-side and B-side.

The video for "Goodbye is Forever" was directed by Marcello Anciano and featured Simon and Nick as figures "stranded in time", almost like two characters out of Samuel Beckett.  They actually appear to be trapped within the elaborate mechanisms of a giant cuckoo clock whilst sitting on chairs that move along a circular railroad-guard.  The moving chairs transport the two pop stars through many strange scenes and surreal episodes involving symbols of time.

"Missing" was directed by Dean Chamberlain and featured many luminous, dreamlike images that were achieved through innovative photographic techniques involving extended exposure times and unique lighting applications. The same video technic system was used later in the 1988 Duran Duran video for All She Wants Is, directed again by Chamberlain.

B-sides, bonus tracks and remixes
"Goodbye is Forever" featured an 'Extended Mix' and 'Dub Mix' by François Kevorkian and Ron Saint Germain.

The 'Single Mix' was done by Alex Sadkin.

The B-side to the single was the album track "Missing".

Formats and track listing

7": Capitol. / B-5542 (United States)
 "Goodbye Is Forever" (Single mix) - 4:11
 "Missing" - 3:41

12": Capitol. / S-75134 (Canada)
 "Goodbye Is Forever" (Extended Remix) - 6:43
 "Missing" - 3:41
 "Goodbye Is Forever" (Single mix) - 4:11

12": Capitol. / V-15218 (United States)
 "Goodbye Is Forever" (Extended Remix) - 6:43
 "Goodbye Is Forever" (Single mix) - 4:11
 "Goodbye Is Forever" (Dub) - 5:14
 "Missing" - 3:41

Other appearances
Albums:
 So Red the Rose (1985)

Personnel
Arcadia are:
Simon Le Bon - vocals, rhythm guitar 
Nick Rhodes - keyboards
Roger Taylor - drums

Also credited:
Alex Sadkin - producer and engineer

References

Arcadia (band) songs
1985 songs
Songs written by Simon Le Bon
Songs written by John Taylor (bass guitarist)
Songs written by Nick Rhodes
Song recordings produced by Alex Sadkin
Parlophone singles
1986 singles